How It Was with Dooms is a children's book dictated to Carol Cawthra Hopcraft by her young son Xan Hopcraft. It tells the true story of the young boy's friendship with an orphaned cheetah on the family's game ranch in Kenya. Carol Hopcraft, a wildlife photographer, provided photographs for the book, while her son provided illustrations. It was published in 1997 by Margaret K. McElderry, a division of Simon & Schuster. (64 pages)
The book was loosely adapted into a film in 2005, under the title Duma.

References

External links
 

1997 children's books
Children's non-fiction books
American children's books
Environment of Kenya
American non-fiction books
Books about cats
Margaret K. McElderry books